Mathurin is a French given name. Notable people with the name include:

 Saint Mathurin or Maturinus (d. 300), French exorcist and missionary
 Mathurin Jacques Brisson (1723–1806), French zoologist and natural philosopher
 Mathurin Cordier or Corderius (ca. 1480 – 1564), French educator
 Mathurin Henrio (1929–1944), young French resistant
 Mathurin Janssaud (1857–1940), French illustrator
 Mathurin Kameni (born 1978), Cameroonian football player
 Simon Mathurin Lantara (1729–1778), French landscape painter
 Mathurin Moreau (1822-1912), French sculptor
 Mathurin Nago, Beninese politician
 Mathurin Régnier (1573–1613), French satirist

See also
Mathurin (surname)